Feed Your Head: Live '67–'69 is the 1996 release of songs from the Jefferson Airplane concerts at Winterland, March 1967, and Monterey Pop Festival. It also has live tracks from Bless Its Pointed Little Head. Don't Slip Away and And I Like It are the studio versions.

Track listing

Personnel
Marty Balin – vocals, guitar
Grace Slick – vocals, piano
Jorma Kaukonen – lead guitar, vocals
Paul Kantner – rhythm guitar, vocals
Jack Casady – bass
Spencer Dryden – drums

Jefferson Airplane live albums
1996 live albums